The Anglican Church of St Andrew in Withypool, Somerset, England was built in late medieval period. It is a Grade II* listed building.

History

The church was built in the Middle Ages but the tower was rebuilt in the early 17th century. A Victorian restoration was carried out in 1887 with further rebuilding in 1902.

The parish is part of the Exmoor benefice within the Diocese of Bath and Wells.

Architecture

The stone building has slate roofs. It consists of a three-bay nave and a north aisle. The two-stage tower is supported by diagonal buttresses. Partly set into the northwest buttress is a medieval carved stone cross.

Within the church is a Norman font. The white stone chalice-shaped font has a scalloped bowl on a cylindrical shaft.

See also
 List of ecclesiastical parishes in the Diocese of Bath and Wells

References

Grade II* listed buildings in West Somerset
Grade II* listed churches in Somerset